The Fantasy Cartographer's Field Book is a 1980 role-playing game supplement published by Judges Guild.

Contents
The Fantasy Cartographer's Field Book is a book of four different types of grids, with pages for recording scale, contents, and key.

Reception
Elisabeth Barrington reviewed The Fantasy Cartographer's Field Book in The Space Gamer No. 31. Barrington commented that "If there are any avid gamers who don't need this book, I would like to meet them. [...] The publishers even suggest using these pages for submitting your designs for publication. And as some of the pages in each type of grid will reproduce, you don't need to go out and buy several packages of graph paper and hex paper. You can make your own."

References

Judges Guild fantasy role-playing game supplements
Role-playing game supplements introduced in 1980